Juhann Mathieu Begarin (born 7 August 2002) is a French professional basketball player for Paris Basketball of the LNB Pro A.

Early life and career 
Begarin was born and raised in the French overseas region of Guadeloupe in the Southern Caribbean. He initially tried to register to play football, but when he could not find the coach, he decided to play basketball. He played for Baie-Mahault BC and then ASC Ban-E-Lot, winning multiple regional titles in his age group. 

Begarin moved to Corbeil-Essonnes, a suburb of Paris, with his family when he was 16 years old to pursue a basketball career. He joined INSEP, a prestigious sports institute in Paris, and played for affiliated club Centre Fédéral in the Nationale Masculine 1 (NM1), the third-tier league of France. In the 2018–19 season, Begarin averaged 11.6 points, 3.4 rebounds and two steals per game in the NM1. In February 2019, he averaged 19.8 points, 6.5 rebounds and 4.3 steals per game at the Adidas Next Generation Tournament Kaunas. In June 2019, Begarin was named most valuable player of the Basketball Without Borders Europe camp in Riga, Latvia. Later in the month, he parted ways with Centre Fédéral.

Professional career

Paris Basketball (2019–present)
On 8 July 2019, Begarin signed with Paris Basketball of the LNB Pro B. He made his debut on 11 October 2019, scoring seven points in a 70–68 win over Fos Provence. In the 2019–20 season, Begarin averaged 4.8 points, 2.1 rebounds and 1.2 assists per game. In the following season, he averaged 11.7 points, 3.5 rebounds and 2.9 assists per game, helping his team earn promotion to the LNB Pro A. On 20 August 2021, it was announced he would return to Paris. In 29 games for the 2021-2022 season playing for Paris Basketball of the LNB Pro A Begarin maintained per game averages of 11.1 points, 4.2 rebounds, 1.5 assists, 1.5 steals, and 0.3 blocks over a 28 minute average. Begarin shot 43.2% on FG's which breaks down to 51.2% on 2pt shots, and 30.9% on 3pt shots, along with 56.3% from the free throw line.

NBA draft rights
In July 2021, Begarin was drafted by the Boston Celtics with the 45th overall pick in the 2021 NBA draft. He played for the Celtics in the 2021 NBA Summer League.

National team career
Begarin played for France at the 2018 FIBA U16 European Championship in Novi Sad, Serbia. He averaged 15.6 points, three rebounds and 2.3 steals per game, leading his team to fourth place. Bégarin represented France at the 2019 FIBA U18 European Championship in Volos, Greece, where he averaged 7.9 points, three rebounds and 1.9 steals per game. He played alongside Malcolm Cazalon and helped his team to a fifth-place finish.

Personal life 
Begarin's older brother, Jessie, is about 14 years his senior and has played basketball professionally in France, including in the LNB Pro A, the first-tier league. Both of his parents played and coached basketball in Guadeloupe.

References

External links
Paris Basketball profile

Living people
2002 births
Boston Celtics draft picks
French men's basketball players
Guadeloupean basketball players
Paris Basketball players
People from Les Abymes
Shooting guards